To Hebe is the debut Mandarin solo studio album of Taiwanese Mandopop artist Hebe Tien, of girl group S.H.E. It was released on 3 September 2010 by HIM International Music. Tien is the first S.H.E member to release a solo album. The preorder edition contains a bonus DVD with eight tracks from Tien's 27th birthday party charity concert, "330 Music Tien Birthday Party" held on 20 March 2010.

The tracks, "寂寞寂寞就好" (Leave Me Alone) and "LOVE!" are listed at number 11 and 35 respectively on Hit Fm Taiwan's Hit Fm Annual Top 100 Singles Chart (Hit-Fm年度百首單曲) for 2010. The album is tied fifth best selling album in Taiwan in 2010, with Rainie Yang's Rainie & Love...?, with 50,000 copies sold.

The album was also nominated for Best Mandarin Album at the 22nd Golden Melody Awards in 2011. It won Best Music Video for "寂寞寂寞就好" (Leave Me Alone) directed by Hsu Yun-Hsuan (徐筠軒) and Best Single Producer for "LOVE!".

Background and development 
Hebe Tien launched her career through the Taiwanese girl group S.H.E under HIM International Music along with her group mates Selina and Ella. On September 11, 2001, during the September 11 attacks, S.H.E released their debut album, Girls Dorm, in memory of their prior living quarters, selling an impressive 150,000 copies for a debut group quashing speculations of unremarkable debut due to the incident. Since debut, S.H.E has released twelve studio albums and received numerous awards and nominations. Tien has since appeared in Taiwanese dramas and has been featured in a few singles. The group's label acknowledged each of the member's strengths and for Tien who loved singing since her childhood, HIM arranged and planned a solo album for her which was in preparation for two years.

Tien intended to release an album where she can sing diverse musical genres that are different from the music of S.H.E. Therefore, she named her album To Hebe as a personal album to show "the girl who loves to sing" and to sing songs she would sing for herself, and to share her different moods to everyone.

Reception

"Small Island" controversy 
Almost twelve years after the release of the album, and following the critical reaction of the People's Republic of China (PRC) to the Speaker of the United States House of Representatives Nancy Pelosi's visit to Taiwan, various Chinese music streaming platforms such as Migu Music and QQ Music removed the track "Small Island" from their streaming service, with the former removing all of Tien's work and her artist information from the platform entirely. According to Little Pinks, the lyrics, "I think that this distance is good, we don't bother each other across the sea," hints about Taiwan independence. The line, "I am a small island, I can't handle great troubles. Tourists, please come back early next time," was also assumed to mean that Mainland tourists are not welcome to visit Taiwan.

Track listing

Personnel 
Credits from the album's liner notes.

Musicians
 Hebe Tien                                                – vocals, background vocals 
 Yoga Lin                                                 – vocals, background vocals 
 Fan Zhezhong (樊哲忠)                           – guitar 
 Allen Lu (盧家宏)                               – guitar 
 Again (蔡科俊)                                  – guitar 
 JerryC                                                   – guitar 
 James Ni (倪方來)                               – guitar 
 Huang Xianzhong (黄顯忠)                       – drums 
 Rafael Lee (李守信)                             – drums 
 Wei Feng 威楓(仔仔)                             – drums 
 Wang Zheng Yi (汪正一)                          – bass 
 Michael Ning (甯子達)            – bass 
 Bing Wang (王治平)         – synth Moog 
 Yu Tsang Li (李雨蒼)                            – violin 
 Jenny Chen (陳怡蓁)                             – violin 
 Wei Sun (孫瑋)                                 – strings 

Technical

 Alex Chang-Chien (張簡君偉)       – executive producer
 Chuman Chu (楚怡辰)                             – executive producer 
 Bing Wang (王治平)         – harmony composer 
 Ma Yu-fen (馬毓芬)                              – harmony composer 
 Guo Wenzong (郭文宗)                            – harmony composer 
 Terrytyelee (梁永泰)                            – harmony composer 
 Martin  (馬丁)                                 – sound engineer
 AJ Chen  (陳文駿)                               – sound engineer , mixing 
 Chief Wang  (王永鈞)                            – sound engineer 
 Eugene Ke  (柯宗佑)                             – sound engineer 
 Jiang Ziqiang  (蔣自強)                         – sound engineer 
 Dave Yang (楊大緯)                              – mixing 
 Adam Huang  (黃欽勝)                            – mixing 
 Craig Burbidge                                               – mixing 

Music video

 Bill Chia (比爾賈)                – director 
 Hsu Yun-Hsuan (徐筠軒)                         – director 
 Shockley Huang (黃中平)                        – director 
 bounce                                                      – director

Music videos

Awards and nominations

References

External links
  S.H.E discography@HIM International Music

2010 debut albums
Hebe Tien albums
HIM International Music albums